Matthew Terence Bound (born 9 November 1972) is an English former football defender.

Career statistics

Honours
Individual
PFA Team of the Year: 1999–2000 Third Division

References

External links

Since 1888... The Searchable Premiership and Football League Player Database (subscription required)

1972 births
Living people
English footballers
Association football defenders
Premier League players
Southampton F.C. players
Hull City A.F.C. players
Stockport County F.C. players
Lincoln City F.C. players
Swansea City A.F.C. players
Oxford United F.C. players
Weymouth F.C. players
Eastleigh F.C. players
English Football League players
People from Melksham